Robert Savage (died 1399), of York, was an English Member of Parliament.

He was a Member (MP) of the Parliament of England for City of York in February 1383 and 1386. He was the Mayor of Calais by July 1394, and Mayor of York  1384-5 and 1391-3.

Savage was the nephew, heir and protege of the merchant, William Savage, who Robert asked to be buried near. Robert married twice: a woman named Katherine, and by 1381 he had married Emma Vescy. They had three sons and one daughter.

References

14th-century births
1399 deaths
Mayors of places in England
14th-century English people
People from York
Calais
Members of the Parliament of England (pre-1707)